AERO Friedrichshafen is a trade show dedicated to European general aviation. It is held yearly in April on the shores of Lake Constance at the exhibition center of Friedrichshafen, Germany right next to Friedrichshafen Airport.

History 
AERO took place for the first time in 1977 during the RMF (Rennsport/Motor/Freizeit; Racing/Motor/Leisure) event. It was held every two years at first. AERO became an independent event in 1993 and is now held yearly since 2009. This aviation convention now attracts more than 600 exhibitors and 33,000 visitors every year.

References

External links 

Aviation in Europe
Aviation in Germany